Murtas is a municipality located in the province of Granada, Spain. Spanning an area of 71.7 km², according to the 2016 census (INE), the city has a population of 495 inhabitants. In 2005 the population was recorded as 741.

References

Municipalities in the Province of Granada